The Pseudomonas exotoxin (or exotoxin A) is an exotoxin produced by Pseudomonas aeruginosa. Vibrio cholerae produces a similar protein called the Cholix toxin.

It inhibits elongation factor-2. It does so by ADP-ribosylation of EF2 using NAD+. This then causes the elongation of polypeptides to cease. This mechanism is similar to that of diphtheria toxin.

It has been investigated as a treatment for hepatitis B and cancer.

References

External links 

P11439 (eta) in InterPro domain view

Bacterial toxins
Proteins